Matei Castriș was a Romanian Brigadier General who was one of the generals of the Romanian Land Forces in the First World War. He served as division commander in the 1916 campaign. He was commanded due to the hesitant manner of leading the subordinate troops, which led to the failure of the occupation of the city of Sibiu, during the initial period of the campaign.

Biography
After graduating from the military school of officers with the rank of lieutenant, Matei Castriș held various positions in the infantry units or in the upper echelons of the army, the most important being the commander of the 1st Border Guard Regiment or the 18th Infantry Brigade.   

During the First World War he served as commander of the 1st Border Guard Brigade , between 14/27 August - 28 August / 10 September 1916 and of the 23rd Infantry Division , between 28 August / 10 September - 9/22 September 1916.

References

Bibliography
 Kiritescu, Constantin, History of the war for the unification of Romania, Scientific and Encyclopedic Publishing House, Bucharest, 1989
 Ioanițiu Alexandru (Lt.-Colonel), The Romanian War: 1916-1918, vol 1, Genius Printing House, Bucharest, 1929
 Romania in the World War 1916-1919, Documents, Annexes, Volume 1, Official Gazette and State Printing Offices, Bucharest, 1934
 The General Headquarters of the Romanian Army. Documents 1916 - 1920 , Machiavelli Publishing House, Bucharest, 1996
 Military history of the Romanian people, vol. V, Military Publishing House, Bucharest, 1989
 Romania in the years of the First World War, Militară Publishing House, Bucharest, 1987
 "Romania in the First World War", Military Publishing House, 1979

1863 births
1924 deaths
Romanian Land Forces generals
Romanian Army World War I generals
Romanian military personnel of the Second Balkan War